Havarabid (also Romanized as Havārābīd; also known as Havārbī) is a village in Lahijan-e Gharbi Rural District, Lajan District, Piranshahr County, West Azerbaijan Province, Iran. At the 2006 census, its population was 158, in 30 families.

References 

Populated places in Piranshahr County